Alhandra may refer to:

People
Alhandra (footballer) (born 1979), Portuguese retired footballer

Places
Alhandra, Paraíba, Brazil; municipality in the state of Paraíba
Alhandra, São João dos Montes e Calhandriz (Alhandra, São João dos Montes and Calhandriz), civil parish in Portugal formed in 2013 as a merger of those three
Alhandra, Portugal, former parish that has since been merged